Al-Kasabi is a Syrian town located in Deir ez-Zor District, Deir ez-Zor.  According to the Syria Central Bureau of Statistics (CBS), the town had a population of 4,325 in the 2004 census.

References 

Populated places in Deir ez-Zor Governorate